Pierre Guffroy (22 April 1926 – 27 September 2010) was a French production designer and art director. He won an Oscar for Tess in 1979 and had been previously nominated for one in another category Best Art Direction for Is Paris Burning? in 1966.

Selected filmography
Guffroy won an Academy Award for Best Art Direction and was nominated for another:
Won
 Tess (1979)
Nominated
 Is Paris Burning? (1966)

References

External links

1926 births
2010 deaths
French production designers
French art directors
Best Art Direction Academy Award winners
Film people from Paris